The tables below are Badminton World Cup medalists of all events (Men's and Women's Singles, Men's and Women's Doubles and Mixed).

Men's singles

Women's singles

Men's doubles

Women's doubles

Mixed doubles

See also
List of BWF World Championships medalists

External links
http://www.sportsrecords.co.uk/badminton/index.htm
http://com4.runboard.com/bsportsworld.fswimming.t155
Smash: World Cup

Lists of badminton players
Lists of sports medalists